Jesper Ahle (born 13 February 1981) is a Danish handball player who plays for Danish Handball League side Team Tvis Holstebro. 

Ahle has made six appearances for the Danish national handball team.

External links
 Player info

1981 births
Living people
Danish male handball players